Equal rights may refer to:

Philosophy and law
Equality before the law, when all people have the same rights
Equal Justice Under Law (civil rights organization)
Human rights, when such rights are held in common by all people
Civil rights, when such rights are held in common by all citizens of a nation
Rights guaranteed under gender equality, proposed variously:
by the women's rights movement growing out of women's suffrage
by the men's rights movement growing out of the men's movement
Equal Rights Amendment, a proposed amendment to the U.S. Constitution that intended to advance such a condition for women's rights
Law of equal liberty, a moral principle described by Herbert Spencer

Other uses
Equal Rights (album), a 1977 reggae release by Peter Tosh
Equal Rights (journal), a 1920s feminist journal; see Mildred Seydell
Equal Rights Beyond Borders, a charitable organisation which assists towards the legal rights of refugees
Equal Rights (motto), the motto of the state of Wyoming, USA

See also
Equal Rights Party (disambiguation)
Equality (disambiguation)
Social equality
Equal Rites, a novel by Terry Pratchett